Beyond may refer to:

Arts, entertainment, and media

Films
Beyond (1921 film), an American silent film
Beyond (2000 film), a Danish film directed by Åke Sandgren, OT: Dykkerne
Beyond (2010 film), a Swedish film directed by Pernilla August, OT: Svinalängorna
Beyond (2012 film), an American thriller directed by Josef Rusnak
Beyond (2014 film), a British science fiction film
"Beyond" (The Animatrix), a segment of the short-film collection The Animatrix
Star Trek Beyond, a 2016 American science fiction film in the Star Trek film franchise

Games 
Beyond Games, a U.S. video game developer founded in 1992
Beyond Software, a 1980s UK video game developer
Beyond: Two Souls, a video game for the PlayStation 3, developed by Quantic Dream
Beyond the Supernatural, a 1980s role-playing game
Stormfront Studios, a U.S. video game developer originally named Beyond Software 1988–1991

Literature
Beyond (book), a 2015 non-fiction book by Chris Impey 
Beyond (comics) (set-index article), things in comics called Beyond, including:
Beyond (Virgin Comics), a 2008 series from Virgin Comics
Beyond!, a 2006 limited series from Marvel Comics
"Beyond" (short story), by William Faulkner
 Beyond: Peter Diamandis and the Adventure of Space, former title of Julian Guthrie's book How to Make a Spaceship (2016)

Periodicals 
Beyond Fantasy Fiction, a US fantasy fiction magazine
Worlds Beyond,  an American digest magazine of science fiction and fantasy fiction

Music

Groups
Beyond (band), a Hong Kong rock band formed in 1983
Beyond (Swiss band), a spiritual musical group founded in 2007 by Swiss singer Regula Curti, along with Tina Turner and Dechen Shak-Dagsay

Albums 
Beyond (Dinosaur Jr. album), 2007
Beyond (Freedom Call album), 2014
Beyond (William Joseph album), 2008
Beyond (Omnium Gatherum album), 2013
Beyond (Joshua Redman album), 2000
Beyond, an album by Hiromitsu Agatsuma
Beyond, a 1980 album by Herb Alpert

Songs 
"Beyond" (song), a 1969 song from the album To Our Children's Children's Children by The Moody Blues
"Beyond", first track from the album Buddhist and Christian Prayers by Beyond, 2010
"Beyond", a ninth track from the album Random Access Memories by Daft Punk, 2013
"Beyond", a third track from the album Trouser Jazz by Mr. Scruff, 2002

Television
Beyond (2005 TV series), a Canadian paranormal documentary TV series
Beyond (2012 TV series), a Singaporean supernatural TV series
Beyond (2017 TV series), an American supernatural drama TV series
Beyond, a 2006 American TV pilot show directed by Breck Eisner
"Beyond", an Avengers Assemble season 4 episode
Beyond International, an Australian television production and distribution company

Other uses
Beyond Meat, a meat substitute manufacturer
Beyond Junior Y Chair, a high chair
Lashauwn Beyond, American drag queen

See also

Beyond Good and Evil (disambiguation)
Beyond Measure (disambiguation)
From Beyond (disambiguation)
The Beyond (disambiguation)
The Great Beyond (film)
"The Great Beyond"